The Nations Cup 1965–66 was the sixth edition of a European rugby union championship for national teams and was the first with this name.  
After the 1954 European Cup, the FIRA did not organize any championship. During the 1964 general assembly in The Hague, it was decided to organize a tournament as a league championship. The teams would be divided in two divisions, with a process of promotion and relegation. The first edition was played between 1965–66. Italy, France, and Romania already played against each other regularly in test matches, so it was easy to arrange this kind of tournament.

First division

Table

Results

Second division

Semifinals

Final

References

Bibliography 
 Francesco Volpe, Valerio Vecchiarelli (2000), 2000 Italia in Meta, Storia della nazionale italiana di rugby dagli albori al Sei Nazioni, GS Editore (2000) 
 Francesco Volpe, Paolo Pacitti (Author), Rugby 2000, GTE Gruppo Editorale (1999).

External links
 FIRA-AER official website

1965–66 in European rugby union
1965–66
1965 rugby union tournaments for national teams
1966 rugby union tournaments for national teams